In electrodynamics, the Larmor formula is used to calculate the total power radiated by a nonrelativistic point charge as it accelerates. It was first derived by J. J. Larmor in 1897, in the context of the wave theory of light.

When any charged particle (such as an electron, a proton, or an ion) accelerates, energy is radiated in the form of electromagnetic waves. For a particle whose velocity is small relative to the speed of light (i.e., nonrelativistic), the total power that the particle radiates (when considered as a point charge) can be calculated by the Larmor formula:

where  or  — is the proper acceleration,  — is the charge, and  — is the speed of light. A relativistic generalization is given by the Liénard–Wiechert potentials.

In either unit system, the power radiated by a single electron can be expressed in terms of the classical electron radius and electron mass as:

One implication is that an electron orbiting around a nucleus, as in the Bohr model, should lose energy, fall to the nucleus and the atom should collapse. This puzzle was not solved until quantum theory was introduced.

Derivation

Derivation 1: Mathematical approach (using CGS units) 

We first need to find the form of the electric and magnetic fields. The fields can be written (for a fuller derivation see Liénard–Wiechert potential)

The terms on the right are evaluated at the retarded time .

The right-hand side is the sum of the electric fields associated with the velocity and the acceleration of the charged particle. Because of this, the acceleration field is representative of the radiation field and is responsible for carrying most of the energy away from the charge.

We can find the energy flux density of the radiation field by computing its Poynting vector:

where the 'a' subscripts emphasize that we are taking only the acceleration field. Substituting in the relation between the magnetic and electric fields while assuming that the particle instantaneously at rest at time  and simplifying gives

This gives

which is the Larmor result for a nonrelativistic accelerated charge. It relates the power radiated by the particle to its acceleration. It clearly shows that the faster the charge accelerates the greater the radiation will be. We would expect this since the radiation field is dependent upon acceleration.

Relativistic generalization

Covariant form

Written in terms of momentum, the nonrelativistic Larmor formula is (in CGS units)

The power  can be shown to be Lorentz invariant. Any relativistic generalization of the Larmor formula must therefore relate  to some other Lorentz invariant quantity. The quantity  appearing in the nonrelativistic formula suggests that the relativistically correct formula should include the Lorentz scalar found by taking the inner product of the four-acceleration  with itself [here  is the four-momentum]. The correct relativistic generalization of the Larmor formula is (in CGS units)

It can be shown that this inner product is given by

Non-covariant form

Then the relativistic generalization of the Larmor formula is (in CGS units)

This is the Liénard result, which was first obtained in 1898. The  means that when the Lorentz factor  is very close to zero (i.e. ) the radiation emitted by the particle is likely to be negligible. However, as  the radiation grows like  as the particle tries to lose its energy in the form of EM waves. The faster the motion becomes the greater this reduction gets.

We can use Liénard's result to predict what sort of radiation losses to expect in different kinds of motion.

Angular distribution

The angular distribution of radiated power is given by a general formula, applicable whether or not the particle is relativistic. In CGS units, this formula is

where  is a unit vector pointing from the particle towards the observer. In the case of linear motion (velocity parallel to acceleration), this simplifies to

where  is the angle between the observer and the particle's motion.

Issues and implications

Radiation reaction
The radiation from a charged particle carries energy and momentum. In order to satisfy energy and momentum conservation, the charged particle must experience a recoil at the time of emission. The radiation must exert an additional force on the charged particle. This force is known as Abraham-Lorentz force while its non-relativistic limit is known as the Lorentz self-force and relativistic forms are known as Lorentz-Dirac force or Abraham–Lorentz–Dirac force.

Atomic physics
A classical electron in the Bohr model orbiting a nucleus experiences acceleration and should radiate. Consequently, the electron loses energy and the electron should eventually spiral into the nucleus. Atoms, according to classical mechanics, are consequently unstable. This classical prediction is violated by the observation of stable electron orbits. The problem is resolved with a quantum mechanical description of atomic physics, initially provided by the Bohr model. Classical solutions to the stability of electron orbitals can be demonstrated using non-radiation conditions and in accordance with known physical laws.

See also
Atomic theory
Cyclotron radiation
Electromagnetic wave equation
Maxwell's equations in curved spacetime
Radiation reaction
Wave equation
Wheeler–Feynman absorber theory

Notes

References

 J. Larmor, "On a dynamical theory of the electric and luminiferous medium", Philosophical Transactions of the Royal Society 190, (1897) pp. 205–300 (Third and last in a series of papers with the same name).
 (Section 14.2ff)
 
 

Antennas (radio)
Atomic physics
Electrodynamics
Electromagnetic radiation
Electromagnetism
Equations of physics